Patrik Jány (born 29 July 1997) is a Slovak sport shooter who competes in the men's 10 metre air rifle. He competed for Slovakia at the 2019 Summer Universiade in Naples, Italy and 2019 European Games in Minsk, Belarus. He competed at the 2020 Summer Olympics in Tokyo, Japan.

References

Slovak male sport shooters
1997 births
Living people
Olympic shooters of Slovakia
Shooters at the 2020 Summer Olympics
Shooters at the 2019 European Games
European Games competitors for Slovakia
Medalists at the 2019 Summer Universiade
Universiade medalists in shooting
Universiade gold medalists for Slovakia
Universiade bronze medalists for Slovakia
People from Banská Štiavnica
Sportspeople from the Banská Bystrica Region